A cerebral shunt is a device permanently implanted inside the head and body to drain excess fluid away from the brain. They are commonly used to treat hydrocephalus, the swelling of the brain due to excess buildup of cerebrospinal fluid (CSF). If left unchecked, the excess CSF can lead to an increase in intracranial pressure (ICP), which can cause intracranial hematoma, cerebral edema, crushed brain tissue or herniation. The drainage provided by a shunt can alleviate or prevent these problems in patients with hydrocephalus or related diseases.

Shunts come in a variety of forms, but most of them consist of a valve housing connected to a catheter, the lower end of which is usually placed in the peritoneal cavity. The main differences between shunts are usually in the materials used to construct them, the types of valve (if any) used, and whether the valve is programmable or not.

Description

Valves types

Shunt location

The location of the shunt is determined by the neurosurgeon based on the type and location of the blockage causing hydrocephalus. All brain ventricles are candidates for shunting. The catheter is most commonly placed in the abdomen but other locations include the heart and lungs. Shunts can often be named after the route used by the neurosurgeon. The distal end of the catheter can be located in just about any tissue with enough epithelial cells to absorb the incoming CSF. Below are some common routing plans for cerebral shunts.

Frazier's point
It is located on the parietal bone, above the lambdoid suture, 3 to 4 cm lateral to the midline and 6 cm above the inion. It is a common site for ventricular cannulation in the context of inserting a ventriculoperitoneal shunt for the treatment of hydrocephalus. It was first described by C H Frazier in 1928.

Shunt routing

A subgaleal shunt is usually a temporary measure used in infants who are too small or premature to tolerate other shunt types. The surgeon forms a pocket beneath the epicranial aponeurosis (the subgaleal space) and allows CSF to drain from the ventricles, creating a fluid-filled swelling on the baby's scalp. These shunts are normally converted to VP or other shunt types once the infant is big enough.

Indications 
Below is a short list of known complications that can lead to hydrocephalus requiring shunting.

Complications
There are a number of complications associated with shunt placement. Many of these complications occur during childhood and cease once the patient has reached adulthood. Many of the complications require immediate shunt revision (the replacement or reprogramming of the already existing shunt). The common symptoms often resemble a new onset of hydrocephalus, such as headaches, nausea, vomiting, double vision, and an alteration of consciousness. This can result in damage to an individual's short-term memory. In the pediatric population, the shunt failure rate two years after implantation has been estimated to be as high as 50%. Those patients with advanced age, prolonged hospital stay, GCS score of less than 13, extra-ventricular drains in situ, or excision of brain tumors are more likely to have early shunt malfunction.

Infection
Infection is a common complication that normally affects pediatric patients because they have not yet built up immunities to a number of different diseases. Normally, the incidence of infection decreases as the patient grows older and the body gains immunity to various infectious agents. 
Shunt infection can occur in up to 27% of patients. Infection can lead to long term cognitive defects, neurological problems, and in some cases death. Common microbial agents for shunt infection include Staphylococcus epidermidis, Staphylococcus aureus, and Candida albicans. Further factors that can lead to shunt infection include shunt insertion at a young age (less than six months old) and the type of hydrocephalus being treated. There is no strong correlation between infection and shunt type.
Though the symptoms of a shunt infection are generally similar to the symptoms seen in hydrocephalus, infection symptoms can also include fever and elevated white blood cell counts.

Treatment of shunt infections

Treatment of a CSF shunt infection generally includes removal of the shunt and placement of a temporary ventricular reservoir until the infection is resolved. There are four main methods of treating ventriculoperitoneal (VP) shunt infections: (1) antibiotics; (2) removal of infected shunt with immediate replacement; (3) externalization of shunt with eventual replacement; (4) removal of infected shunt with external ventricular drain (EVD) placement and eventual shunt re-insertion. The last method has the highest success rate at over 95%.

Medical treatment of shunt infection

Initial empiric therapy for CSF shunt infection should include broad antibiotic coverage for gram-negative aerobic bacilli including pseudomonas as well as for gram-positive organisms including Staphylococcus aureus and coagulase-negative staphylococcus, such as a combination of ceftazidime and vancomycin. Some clinicians add parenteral or intrathecal aminoglycosides to enhance pseudomonas coverage, although the efficacy of the aminoglycosides is not clear. Meropenem and aztreonam are additional antibiotic options that are effective against gram-negative bacterial infections.

Surgical treatment of shunt infection

To evaluate the benefit of surgical shunt removal or externalization followed by removal, Wong et al. compared two groups: one with medical treatment alone, and another with medical and surgical treatment simultaneously. 28 patients with infection after ventriculoperitoneal shunt implantation over an 8-year period in their neurosurgical center were studied. 17 of these patients were treated with shunt removal or externalization followed by removal in addition to IV antibiotics while the other 11 were treated with IV antibiotics only. The group receiving both surgical shunt removal and antibiotics showed lower mortality – 19% versus 42% (p = 0.231). Despite the fact that these results are not statistically significant, Wong et al. suggest managing VP shunt infections via both surgical and medical treatment.

An analysis of 17 studies published over the past 30 years regarding children with CSF shunt infections revealed that treating with both shunt removal and antibiotics successfully treated 88% of 244 infections, while antibiotic therapy alone successfully treated the CSF shunt infection in only 33% of 230 infections.

While typical surgical methods of handling VP shunt infections involve removal and reimplantation of the shunt, different types of operations have used with success in select patients. 
Steinbok et al. treated a case of recurrent VP shunt infections in an eczematous patient with a ventriculosubgaleal shunt for two months until the eczema healed completely. This type of shunt allowed them to avoid the area of diseased skin that acted as the source of infection.
Jones et al. have treated 4 patients with non-communicating hydrocephalus who had VP shunt infections with shunt removal and third ventriculostomy. These patients were cured of the infection and have not required shunt re-insertion, thus showing the effectiveness of this procedure in these types of patients.

Obstruction
Another leading cause of shunt failure is a blockage of the shunt at either the proximal or distal end. At the proximal end, the shunt valve can become blocked due to the buildup of excess protein in the CSF. The extra protein will collect at the point of drainage and slowly clog the valve. The shunt can also become blocked at the distal end if the shunt is pulled out of the abdominal cavity (in the case of VP shunts), or from similar protein buildup. Other causes of blockage are overdrainage and slit ventricle syndrome.

Over drainage
Over drainage occurs when a shunt has not been adequately designed for the particular patient. Overdrainage can lead to a number of different complications some of which are highlighted below.

Usually one of two types of overdrainage can occur. First, when the CSF drains too rapidly, a condition known as extra-axial fluid collection can occur. In this condition the brain collapses on itself resulting in the collection of CSF or blood around the brain. This can cause severe brain damage by compressing the brain, and a subdural hematoma may develop. Extra-axial fluid collection can be treated in three different ways depending on the severity of the condition. Usually the shunt will be replaced or reprogrammed to release less CSF, and the fluid that has collected around the brain will be drained. The second condition, known as slit ventricle syndrome, occurs when CSF overdrains slowly over several years. More information on slit ventricle syndrome appears below.

Chiari I malformation
Recent studies have shown that over drainage of CSF due to shunting can lead to acquired Chiari I malformation. It was previously thought that Chiari I Malformation was a result of a congenital defect but new studies have shown that overdrainage of Cysto-peritoneal shunts used to treat arachnoid cysts can lead to the development of posterior fossa overcrowding and tonsillar herniation, the latter of which is the classic definition of Chiari Malformation I. Common symptoms include major headaches, hearing loss, fatigue, muscle weakness and loss of cerebellum function.

Slit ventricle syndrome
Slit ventricle syndrome is an uncommon disorder associated with shunted patients, but results in a large number of shunt revisions. The condition usually occurs several years after shunt implantation. The most common symptoms are similar to normal shunt malfunction, but there are several key differences. First, the symptoms are often cyclical and will appear and then subside several times over a lifetime. Second, the symptoms can be alleviated by lying prone. In the case of shunt malfunction neither time nor postural position will affect the symptoms.

The condition is often thought to occur during a period where overdrainage and brain growth occur simultaneously. In this case, the brain fills the intraventricular space, leaving the ventricles collapsed. Furthermore, the compliance of the brain will decrease, which prevents the ventricles from enlarging, thus reducing the chance for curing the syndrome. The collapsed ventricles can also block the shunt valve, leading to obstruction. Since the effects of slit ventricle syndrome are irreversible, constant care in managing the condition is needed.

Intraventricular hemorrhage
An intraventricular hemorrhage can occur at any time during or after a shunt insertion or revision. Intraparenchymal hemorrhages that are multi-focal in nature have also been described in the pediatric population following ventriculoperitoneal shunting. The hemorrhage can cause an impairment in shunt function which can lead to severe neurological deficiencies. Studies have shown that intraventricular hemorrhage can occur in nearly 31% of shunt revisions.

Outcomes and prognosis

Shunt removal
Though there have been many cases of patients reaching "shunt independence", there is no general agreement among doctors on how to determine which patients might survive without a shunt. It can be very difficult to discern whether a patient could be shunt independent, except under some very specific circumstances. Overall, the permanent removal of a shunt is a rare but not unheard of procedure.

See also
 External ventricular drain
 Wade-Dahl-Till valve

External links
 X-ray Identification of different CSF Shunt Valves - www.shuntvalves.com

References

Neurosurgical procedures
Medical equipment
Implants (medicine)
Ventricular system